Apodichthys is a small genus of marine ray-finned fishes belonging to the family Pholidae, the gunnels. These fishes are found in the eastern Pacific Ocean.

Species
Apodichthys contains 2 species:
 Apodichthys flavidus Girard, 1854 (Penpoint gunnel)
 Apodichthys fucorum Jordan & Gilbert, 1895 (Rockweed gunnel)

References

Apodichthyinae
 
Taxa named by Charles Frédéric Girard